Curtis Steven Brown (born January 15, 1960) is a former professional baseball pitcher. He played parts of four seasons in Major League Baseball between 1983 and 1987.

External links

1960 births
Living people
American expatriate baseball players in Canada
Baseball players from Fort Lauderdale, Florida
California Angels players
Charlotte Knights players
Columbus Clippers players
Denver Zephyrs players
Edmonton Trappers players
Holyoke Millers players
Idaho Falls Angels players
Indianapolis Indians players
Major League Baseball pitchers
Montreal Expos players
New York Yankees players
Redwood Pioneers players
Rochester Red Wings players
Salinas Angels players
Spokane Indians players
Tacoma Tigers players
St. Thomas Aquinas High School (Florida) alumni